Jaku may refer to:

Jaku language, Nigeria
Jaku, principle of silence in the Japanese tea ceremony
Jaku (album), Japanese hip-hop album by DJ Krush

See also 
Jakku, a fictional desert planet in the Star Wars universe